Casavant Frères Ltée. Opus 1841 is a pipe organ built by the famous Casavant Frères of Saint-Hyacinthe, Quebec. The organ was first completed in 1911 as Casavant Brothers - Opus 452 for St. Andrew's Presbyterian Church at 40 Bentinck Street, Sydney, Nova Scotia, Canada. St. Andrew's later became St. Andrew's United Church and is now the Highland Arts Theatre.

Opus 1841 is presently composed of 33 speaking stops spread over three manuals  and pedals. The 2,045 pipe organ is the largest such instrument on Cape Breton Island. Its facade, casing, pipes, swell and chorus boxes completely fill the apse of the theatre.

History

1911
Opus 452 was purchased for the new church, then under construction, in 1911 for $5,395. A Stoplist for the 1911 instrument copied from the factory specifications for Casavant Opus 452 1911 3/29, courtesy of the Casavant Frères Archives, St. Hyacinthe, Québec, Canada is available by following this link: Original Stoplist

1946
The organ was rebuilt in 1946 by Casavant Frères Ltée. as Opus 1841, at a cost of $7,600.00.  Key- and stop- actions were partly electrified, three new Choir stops were added, a new traditional style console with roll top was supplied with three manuals, 4 divisions, 33 stops, 30 registers, 32 ranks, 2045 pipes. Manual compass is 61 notes, pedal compass is 32 notes. Equipped with electro-pneumatic (EP) chests, drawknobs in vertical rows on angled jambs, balanced swell shoes/pedals at standard AGO placement, adjustable combination pistons, AGO Standard (concave radiating) pedalboard, reversible full organ/tutti toe stud, combination action thumb pistons, combination action toe studs, coupler reversible thumb pistons, coupler reversible toe studs.

1962/63
In 1962 and 1963 further work was undertaken, some of the stops were taken back to the factory and re-cast, the Clarion 4' replaced the Vox Humana, the Trompette 8' replaced the Cornopean, & the Hooded Harmonic Trumpet replaced an earlier Trumpet on the Great Organ, with tonal changes (new pipework supplied) made by Casavant via Ledoux & MacDonald Organ Service Co., Halifax. New lead action tubing was provided for the pipes in the façade that sound. (The façade is not just a pretty face, 30 of those ornamental pipes actually make sounds.) Wind is supplied by a 3 hp electric blower located in the basement directly below the organ.

1985 to 2005
Over a twenty year period nearly all the old action tubing was replaced with vinyl plastic tubing. For one small chest of 32 pipes which are used in two different departments of the organ,  (duplexed), approximately one thousand feet of tubing had to be replaced.

2008
The 18-ton organ underwent $15,000 in repairs to its bellows in 2008, with the sheep skin seams being replaced by rubberized bellows cloth. The repairs were undertaken by Maritime Pipe Organ Builders Ltd. of Moncton, New Brunswick. The tubular chimes in the Swell Organ, now disconnected, were donated in about 1929 by the Lady's Aid group of the Church. They were activated by an electro-pneumatic action and were dis-connected from the wind supply during repairs to the bellows.

2017
In February 2017 Organ Tuner Jean-François Mailhot of Sydney Mines spent a week refurbishing Opus 1841, revoicing the reed stops (cleaning the reed tongues and shallots) of the swell organ: the 8' Trompette, the 8' Oboe, and the 4' Clarion, as well as the 16' Trombone of the Pedal Organ.  At this time he also repaired a damaged facade pipe, part of the 8' Open Diapason stop of the Great Organ.

Basic specification
Builder: Casavant Frères Ltée, St. Hyacinthe, Québec, Canada
Opus No: 1841, Originally built by Casavant Brothers - Opus 452, 1911
Console: traditional style console with roll top
3 manuals
shoes/pedals, standard AGO placement
AGO Standard (concave radiating) pedalboard
Stop controls: drawknob
Speaking stops: 33
Registers: 30
Ranks: 32
Pipes: 2045
Wind:
Power: 3 hp electric blower

Stoplist since 1962 tonal work

 Couplers: I Great to Pedal, II Swell to Pedal, III Choir to Pedal,  IV Great Super to Pedal, V Swell Super to Pedal, VII Choir Super to Pedal, VIII Swell Sub to Great, IX Swell to Great, X Swell Super to Great, XI Choir Sub to Great, XII Choir to Great, XIII Choir Super to Great, XIV Swell Sub to Choir, XV Swell to Choir, XVI Swell Super to Choir.

Organists
 W. D. Fife was the organist when the church was being built, & signed the contract for the organ, but moved away before it was completed.
Other organists over the years were:
 A. F. MacKinnon
 Fred Liscombe
 Edward Stuart
 H. W. Sparrow
 William Raines
 John B. Neild just after WW I & at least well into 1925, (he was a Conference delegate to the first Maritime Conference meeting in 1925)
 William E. Fletcher
 R. MacK. Wiles
 A. J. McKnight
 Mrs. Frank Crossen
 W. D. Fife came back during WWII, signed the contract for the electrification & enlargement, then retired & moved to New Glasgow before it was finished.
He was succeeded by:
 Clifford L. Gates in 1946
 Vernon H. Atkinson in 1951
 S. Peter Fraser in 1964

Concerts

While still serving as a church, St. Andrew's was considered to be perhaps the finest concert venue in the city of Sydney. Before its rebirth as an arts centre, the building had a distinguished background as a performance space. St. Andrew's Choir presented many cantatas over the years and massed choirs from eight of Sydney's churches assembled in St. Andrew's to sing as individual choirs and as a group the new and old Christmas carols. Radio broadcasts of  Classical musicians regularly held recitals and concerts there over the years because of the building's outstanding acoustical properties and its Casavant Freres organ. In the mid 1950s St. Andrew's was a regular stop for one of the incarnations of the Halifax Symphony Orchestra whose performances at St. Andrew's were broadcast regionally and even nationally by CBC Radio. Thomas Mayer was the conductor.  He would often invite local performers to join them, at the time there were several operatic sopranos and mezzo-sopranos from Cape Breton who gained a national following because of these broadcasts.  More recently, due to its seating capacity of over 1,000, and excellent acoustics it was sought after by organizations such as Celtic Colours, The Barra MacNeils, and the Cape Breton Chorale.

Gallery

Further reading

References

External links
 Official Highland Arts Theatre Site
 Casavant Brothers, Ltd., Opus 452, 1911.
 Casavant Frères Ltée., Opus 1841, 1946.
 Casavant Frères website

Individual pipe organs
Arts centres in Canada
Theatres in Nova Scotia
Community theatre
Music venues in Nova Scotia
Buildings and structures in the Cape Breton Regional Municipality
Tourist attractions in Cape Breton County
Former churches in Canada